Georges Baussan (1874 – 1958) was a Haitian architect. He worked in Port au Prince. His most famous work was the design of the National Palace of Haiti in 1917 which won an international competition. He died in 1958 at the age of 82.

References

Further reading
 Phillips, Anghelen Arrington. Gingerbread Houses: Haïti's Endangered Species. Impr. H. Deschamps, 1975.

1874 births
1958 deaths
Haitian architects
20th-century architects